Mo Chua or Crónán mac Bécáin, also called Claunus, Cuan, Mochua, Moncan and Moncain (died 30 March 637) was a legendary Irish saint who founded the monastery in Balla.

Life
Mo Chua was the youngest of the three sons of Becan (supposedly descended from Lugaid mac Con) and Cumne (daughter of Conamail of the Dál mBuinne). His hair fell out in patches, and he worked as a shepherd. Comgall of Bangor happening to visit Becan's house, and finding Mo Chua neglected by the family, took him with him to Bangor to educate him. 

Later, Mo Chua founded Feara-rois monastery in Monaghan, before traveling in 616, at the age of thirty-five, to Connaught, where he lived as a hermit in a stone cell. Eochaidh Minnech, a chieftain of the Clan Fiachra, found him there, and gave him the land to found a monastery, calling him 'Mochua of the narrow prison.' The ruins of the Balla monastery, and the later Balla Round Tower, still remain on the location.

Different accounts claimed that Mo Chua lived at Balla for either twenty-one or thirty-one years, before dying on 30 March 637. The Catholic Church therefore celebrates his feast day on 30 March, although the Acta Sanctorum erroneously lists it as 1 January.

Legend
A number of miracles and heroic acts are attributed to Mo Chua, who is in large part a legendary figure.

According to one story, a woman came to Mo Chua during his education in Bangor, intending to ask him to pray for her to have children. When she found him absorbed in prayer and weeping, she caught his tears in her hand, drank them, and obtained her desire.

In another story, Mo Chua was guided by a miraculous moving fountain from Bangor to Ross Darbrech, passing on the way through Gael, Fore, Tech Telle, Hy Many, Lough Cime, and Ros Dairbhreach, where it stopped and was at once surrounded by a wall of massive stones, forming the Balla Round Tower.

Mo Chua supposedly once encountered two mighty women named Bee and Lithben, who transported passengers over a dangerous creek in a basket, and converted and baptized both them and their fathers.

Other legendary exploits of Mo Chua include piercing a mountain to bring water from Lough Leane to a mill in Fore, transferring the yellow color of the Yellow Plague to his crozier (winning him the title of Bachall Buidhe, 'Yellow Crozier'), defeating a monster in Lough Cime, and shaking his crozier to create a bridge over Lough Conn connecting Inishlee Island to the mainland.

References

Attribution

637 deaths
6th-century Christian saints
6th-century Irish priests
Medieval Irish saints
Medieval saints of Connacht
Medieval saints of Leinster
Medieval saints of Meath
Christian clergy from County Down
Christian clergy from County Mayo
Year of birth unknown